Antigo (YTB-792) was a United States Navy  named for Antigo, Wisconsin. She is the second ship to bear the name.

Construction

The contract for Antigo was awarded 16 June 1966. She was laid down on 27 September 1966 at Marinette, Wisconsin, by Marinette Marine and launched 18 April 1967.

Operational history
The second USS Antigo (YTB-792) was laid down on 27 September 1966 at Marinette, Wisconsin, by the Marinette Marine Corp.; launched on 18 April 1967; completed in July 1967; and placed in service soon thereafter.

Assigned to the 6th Naval District and based at Charleston, South Carolina, Antigo spent her entire Navy career providing towing and other support services for ships visiting Charleston.

Stricken from the Navy Directory 25 June 1999 she was sold through the General Services Administration (GSA) for reuse 17 May 2000. Currently in civilian service as Donal G. McAllister.

References

External links
 

Natick-class large harbor tugs
Ships built by Marinette Marine
1967 ships